Ruth Davidon Rodgers (born March 20, 1964 in New York City) is an American rower and medical doctor. As Ruth Davidon, she finished 6th in the single sculls at the 1996 Summer Olympics and 4th in the double sculls at the 2000 Summer Olympics.  A San Francisco-area anaesthesiologist who practices under the name Ruth A. Rodgers, M.D., her parents were essayist Ann Morrissett and physicist William C. Davidon, noted peace and justice activists.

References 
 
 

1964 births
Living people
Sportspeople from New York City
Rowers at the 1996 Summer Olympics
Rowers at the 2000 Summer Olympics
Olympic rowers of the United States
The Baldwin School alumni
World Rowing Championships medalists for the United States
American female rowers
Pan American Games medalists in rowing
Pan American Games silver medalists for the United States
Pan American Games bronze medalists for the United States
Rowers at the 1995 Pan American Games
Medalists at the 1995 Pan American Games
21st-century American women